Dany Jiménez (born December 23, 1993) is a Dominican professional baseball pitcher for the Oakland Athletics of Major League Baseball (MLB). He has previously played in MLB for the San Francisco Giants.

Career

Toronto Blue Jays
Jiménez signed with the Toronto Blue Jays as an international free agent on August 6, 2015. He spent the 2015 season with the Dominican Summer League Blue Jays, going 1–0 with a 5.19 ERA over  innings. He split the 2016 season between the DSL and the Rookie-level Gulf Coast League Blue Jays, going a combined 3–2 with a 2.72 ERA over  innings in which he struck out 48 batters. He split the 2017 season between the GCL and the Short SeasonA Vancouver Canadians, going a combined 2–3 with a 5.49 ERA over  innings in which he struck out 24 batters.

Jiménez spent the 2018 season with the ClassA Lansing Lugnuts, transitioning to being a full-time relief pitcher, going 6–2 with 13 saves and a 3.84 ERA and 80 strikeouts over  innings (averaging 11.4 strikeouts per nine innings). He split the 2019 season between the AdvancedA Dunedin Blue Jays and the DoubleA New Hampshire Fisher Cats, going a combined 7–3 with 10 saves and a 2.59 ERA and 90 strikeouts over 59 innings (averaging 14.2 strikeouts per nine innings).

San Francisco Giants
On December 12, 2019, Jiménez was selected by the San Francisco Giants in the 2019 Rule 5 draft. He made his major league debut on July 23, 2020, pitching a scoreless  inning against the Los Angeles Dodgers. Jiménez was designated for assignment on July 30.

Toronto Blue Jays (second stint)
On August 2, Jiménez cleared waivers and was returned to the Blue Jays organization.

Oakland Athletics
On December 10, 2020, the Oakland Athletics selected Jiménez in the second round of the Rule5 draft.

Toronto Blue Jays (third stint)
On March 15, 2021, Jiménez was returned to the Blue Jays and invited to Spring Training as a non-roster invitee. Jiménez spent the 2021 season with the Triple-A Buffalo Bisons. He made 39 appearances for them, going 3-3 with a 2.22 ERA and 79 strikeouts. On October 5, Jiménez elected free agency.

Oakland Athletics (second stint)
On November 4, 2021, Jiménez signed a minor league deal with the Oakland Athletics. On April 7, 2022, the A's selected Jiménez's contract, adding him to their opening day roster.

See also
Rule 5 draft results

References

External links

1993 births
Living people
Buffalo Bisons (minor league) players
Dominican Republic expatriate baseball players in Canada
Dominican Republic expatriate baseball players in the United States
Dominican Summer League Blue Jays players
Dunedin Blue Jays players
Gulf Coast Blue Jays players
Lansing Lugnuts players
Major League Baseball pitchers
Major League Baseball players from the Dominican Republic
New Hampshire Fisher Cats players
Oakland Athletics players
People from San Cristóbal, Dominican Republic
San Francisco Giants players
Vancouver Canadians players
Tigres del Licey players